IAC may refer to:

Medicine
 IAC (chemotherapy), a chemotherapy regimen
 Internal auditory canal

Organizations
 IAC (company), an American media company
 India Against Corruption
 Indigenous Advisory Council, an Australian government agency
 Instituto de Astrofísica de Canarias, an astrophysical research institute in the Canary Islands
 Inter-African Committee on Traditional Practices Affecting the Health of Women and Children, a rights organization
 International Action Center, a leftist organization
 International Aerobatic Club, an American sports governing body
 International Astronautical Congress
 Interstate Athletic Conference, an all-boys high school sports league in the Washington, D.C. area
 Interstate Aviation Committee, a civil aviation authority in the Commonwealth of Independent States
 Irish Air Corps, the aviation wing of the Irish Defense Forces
 Industrial Assessment Center, an American training program and research program
 InterAcademy Council, global network of academies of science, engineering, and medicine
 International Advisory Council, operates  the International Teletraffic Congress
 Israeli-American Council, an American nonprofit umbrella organization
 Istituto per le Applicazioni del Calcolo Mauro Picone, an Italian applied mathematics research institute

Sport
 Indy Autonomous Challenge, a 2021 race for autonomous cars at the Indianapolis Motor Speedway
 Indoor Africa Cup, the Indoor hockey at Africa

Other uses
 I'm a Celebrity...Get Me Out of Here! (British TV series), in TV Shows
 Idle air controller, in an internal combustion engine
 Imperfect authentic cadence, in music
 Ineffective assistance of counsel, in US law
 Infrastructure as Code, a technique for managing computer hardware, as software. 
 Interapplication communication, in computing
 Interactive activation and competition networks, a kind of neural network
 International access code, in telecommunications
 Indigenous Aircraft Carrier, an Indian Navy designation for aircraft carriers built in India
 Image of the absolute conic, in computer vision; see Camera resectioning
 Idol Star Athletics Championships, a popular South Korean TV variety program (alternately abbreviated as "ISAC")

See also 
 IACS (disambiguation)